The Flood is a 1958 Czech drama film directed by Martin Frič.

Cast
 Zdeněk Štěpánek as Ryba
 Otomar Krejča as Josef
 Slávka Budínová as Josef's wife
 Gustav Heverle as Karel
 Ivanka Devátá as Zuzka
 Karel Fiala as Marko
 Jan Pivec as Doctor
 Václav Lohniský as Ing. Netousek
 Zdeněk Řehoř as Ing. zemánek
 František Vnouček as Placek
 František Holar as Kadlec

References

External links
 

1958 films
1958 drama films
1950s Czech-language films
Czechoslovak black-and-white films
Films directed by Martin Frič
Czechoslovak drama films
1950s Czech films